The Coral Sea is a book by Patti Smith, published in 1996. In 2008 Smith released The Coral Sea as an album with musical accompaniment by Kevin Shields of My Bloody Valentine, recorded during two live performances of the duo.

Contents

Voyage 
 "The Passenger M"
 "The Throw"
 "Light Play"
 "Rank and File"
 "Music (A Woman)"
 "Staff of Life"
 "After Thoughts"
 "An Auctioned Heart"
 "A Bed of Roses"
 "Monkeyshines"
 "The Herculean Moth"
 "The Solomon Islands"
 "The Pedestal"

Litany 
 "Crux"
 "Magua"
 "Imago"

Notes

External links 
 The Coral Sea at W. W. Norton & Company
 
 Live album with Kevin Shields

Poetry by Patti Smith
1996 books
Books by Patti Smith
W. W. Norton & Company books